Callum Blu Stretch (born September 19, 1999) is a Puerto Rican football player who currently plays as a defender for Indiana University.

International career
Stretch made his international debut for Puerto Rico in a 1–0 win over the Dominican Republic.

Career statistics

International

References

External links
 Callum Stretch at the University of Denver

1999 births
Living people
Puerto Rican footballers
Puerto Rico international footballers
American soccer players
United States men's youth international soccer players
American sportspeople of Puerto Rican descent
Denver Pioneers men's soccer players
Indiana Hoosiers men's soccer players
Association football defenders
LA Galaxy players
Aston Villa F.C. players
Ocean City Nor'easters players
USL League Two players
Soccer players from California